The Foundation is the first major-label studio album by American country music band Zac Brown Band. It was released on November 18, 2008. Originally slated for release on the Home Grown label and Big Picture Records, the album is distributed by Atlantic Nashville in association with those two labels. The financing for the album was provided by Atlanta, GA entrepreneur Braden Copeland through his investment company Braden Copeland Ventures, LLC. On December 2, 2009, the album was nominated for the Grammy Award for Best Country Album. and also earned the band the Grammy Award for Best New Artist on January 31. The album also has been nominated for the 2010 Academy of Country Music Awards "Album of the Year" award. As of September 2015, the album has sold 3.4 million copies in the US. It is the only album to feature Joel Williams, who left the band prior to its release.

Content
The album includes five singles, starting with "Chicken Fried," which the band had previously recorded on its 2005 self-released album Home Grown. One year later, The Lost Trailers released this song as a single on BNA Records, but the label withdrew the single after Brown changed his mind about licensing the song. The Zac Brown Band's rendition became a Number One country hit on the Billboard Hot Country Songs charts in December 2008.

Four further singles were released from the album – "Whatever It Is," "Toes," "Highway 20 Ride" and "Free" – the latter three of which were also Number One hits. Additionally, "Different Kind of Fine" also entered the chart as an album cut from unsolicited airplay, where it reached number 55.

Track listing

Personnel
 Zac Brown – acoustic guitar, lead vocals, background vocals
 Jimmy De Martini – fiddle, background vocals
 Greenwood Hart – keyboards, Hammond B-3 organ, accordion
 John Driskell Hopkins – bass guitar, background vocals, second lead vocals on "It's Not OK"
 Brent Mason – electric guitar
 Marcus Petruska – drums, percussion, background vocals
 Gary Prim – keyboards, Hammond B-3 organ
 Joel Williams – electric guitar

Charts

Weekly charts

Year-end charts

Decade-end charts

Certifications

References

2008 albums
Zac Brown Band albums
Atlantic Records albums
Albums produced by Keith Stegall
Bigger Picture Music Group albums